Stanley Joseph Stasica (June 24, 1919 – July 21, 2012) was an American and Canadian football player who played for the Miami Seahawks and Regina Roughriders. He played college football at South Carolina University before transferring to the University of Illinois at Urbana–Champaign.

References

External links
Just Sports Stats

1919 births
2012 deaths
American football halfbacks
Canadian football running backs
American players of Canadian football
South Carolina Gamecocks football players
Illinois Fighting Illini football players
Miami Seahawks players
Saskatchewan Roughriders players
Players of American football from Illinois
Sportspeople from Rockford, Illinois